Ginter is a both a given name and surname of German origin, derived from the name Günther. Notable people with the name include:

Adam Ginter, Polish sprint canoer
Keith Ginter, American Major League Baseball player
Lewis Ginter, American philanthropist and businessman, one of the founders of Allen & Ginter
Lindsey Ginter, American actor
Matt Ginter, American Major League Baseball pitcher
Matthias Ginter, German footballer
Ginter Gawlik, German-Polish soccer player

See also 
Ginter Building, historic building in Eau Gallie, Florida
Ginter Park, suburb neighborhood of Richmond, Virginia built on land owned and developed by Lewis Ginter
Lewis Ginter Botanical Garden, in Richmond, Virginia named after Lewis Ginter

Günther (disambiguation)

References

German-language surnames